The Baptist Union of Scotland is a Baptist Christian denomination in Scotland. It is affiliated with the Baptist World Alliance. The headquarters is in Glasgow.

History

From the 1650s to 1869
Baptists first arrived in Scotland with the armies of English republican Oliver Cromwell in the 1650s, who established small churches in Leith, Perth, Cupar, Ayr and Aberdeen, but they did not survive for long, partly because of their association with Cromwell (who was generally not welcomed in Scotland), but more especially as a result of strident and often violent opposition instigated and inspired by the Church of Scotland and the Parliament of Scotland which it controlled. Baptists later emerged in the 18th century—in 1750 at Keiss, where the leader was William Sinclair and the church was established on the English Baptist pattern. The group who in Edinburgh came to Baptist convictions in 1765 under the leadership of Robert Carmichael and Archibald McLean became known as Scotch Baptists. Like other Scottish Protestant Christians of the time they were very conservative and adopted the opinions of a particularly strict form of Calvinism. Somewhat later, a different form of Baptist witness emerged, this time influenced by the Haldane brothers, James Haldane and Robert Haldane evangelical preachers who came to Baptist convictions around 1808. Along with the English Baptists, they were distinguished from the Scotch Baptists by their more moderate and less Calvinistic attitudes. After overcoming initial hostilities, all these groups were able to unite in 1869.

1869 to the present day
The Baptist Union of Scotland was founded in Hope Street Chapel (later Adelaide Place Baptist Church) in 1869, with 51 churches in its membership, which represented almost 4000 members. One of its early presidents (in 1873) was the philanthropist Thomas Coats.

According to a denomination census released in 2020, it claimed 158 churches and 10,248 members. 

The Baptist Union of Scotland is served by a team comprising Rev Martin Hodson (General Director), Rev Dr Jim Purves (Mission & Ministry Advisor), Rev Peter Dick (Finance Director), Rev Ali Laing (Next Generation Development Coordinator), Rev Professor Andrew Clarke (Continuing Ministry Development Lead).

Beliefs
The Convention has a Baptist confession of faith. It is a member of the Baptist World Alliance.

See also
Religion in Scotland

Footnotes

References
Wardin, Albert W., ed. (1995) Baptists Around the World: a comprehensive handbook. Nashville, Tenn: Broadman & Holman 
McBeth, H. Leon (1987) The Baptist Heritage: Four Centuries of Baptist Witness. Nashville, Tenn: Broadman Press
Murray, Derek Boyd (1969) The First Hundred Years: the Baptist Union of Scotland. Glasgow: Baptist Union of Scotland
Bebbington, David W., ed. (1988) The Baptists in Scotland: a History. Glasgow: Baptist Union of Scotland

Further reading
McBeth, H. Leon (1990) A Sourcebook for Baptist Heritage. Nashville, Tenn: Broadman Press
Talbot, Brian (2014) 'A Distinctive People', Milton Keynes, Paternoster
Purves, Jim (2018) ‘Becoming Who We Are’, Glasgow, Baptist Union of Scotland

External links
Baptist Union of Scotland - official Web Site
Scottish Baptist College - official Web Site

Baptist denominations in Scotland
Religious organizations established in 1869
1869 establishments in Scotland